Lila Yolanda Andrade (Mexico City, 1923 - November 3, 2015) was a Mexican teacher and writer.

She studied Spanish literature at the National Autonomous University of Mexico and was one of the founders of the General Society of Mexican Writers (SOGEM). She worked mainly as a script writer.

Works 
 1982, El sabor de las aves
 2011, La infamia contra la mujer a través de los siglos

Scripts
 1967, Adriana 
 1969, Tú eres mi destino 
 1986, Herencia maldita
 1989, Lo blanco y lo negro
 1995, Bajo un mismo rostro 
 1996, Bendita mentira
 1997, Mujer, casos de la vida real

References

1923 births
2015 deaths
Mexican women screenwriters
National Autonomous University of Mexico alumni
Writers from Mexico City
20th-century Mexican screenwriters
21st-century Mexican screenwriters